The Little Engine That Could is a 2011 American computer-animated adventure film based on the 1930 story by Watty Piper.

Plot

In Dream Land, Little Engine (Alyson Stoner) wakes up the control tower (Whoopi Goldberg) and a few of the Dream Hauler engines so that she can start work while also dreaming of becoming a Dream Hauler someday. She comes by the birthday present train and attempts to follow it to the Real World, but she is suddenly stopped by the Tower. Little Engine then tries to pull several boxcars for Big Locomotive, but she ends up causing traffic for the other engines with the Tower reminding her that she is only supposed to pull one boxcar at a time due to her small size. Little Engine later gets help from Rusty (Jim Cummings), who is an old but wise engine.

In the Real World, a boy named Richard (Dominic Scott Kay) shows his best friend, Marcus, his grandfather's pocket watch. Two bullies named Scott and Stretch throw a snowball at Richard, which makes him slip and accidentally hand the watch over to them. He is worried that his dad would be disappointed that he lost the watch. Marcus tries to help him with some suggestions on how to get the watch back, but Richard does not want help from him at all. Richard then decides to take a walk in the park, but trips over some train tracks he has never noticed before and happens to finds a train nearby. He boards one of its boxcars to take shelter from the freezing cold conditions, unaware that it is pulled by Rusty (who is sleeping on the job) and suddenly wakes him up. He immediately returns to Dream Land not realizing that Richard is inside the boxcar. While passing through the tunnel to Dream Land, the tunnel collapses, trapping Richard and the trains in Dream Land. After Rusty informs the others what happened, Richard climbs out and is both confused and scared by the talking trains. The Tower realizes that Richard's presence in Dream Land has damaged the dream-reality continuum and can only be fixed if Richard is returned to the real world. She sends some of the engines to dig out the tunnel and is forced to demote Rusty to a track-cleaner, much to Little Engine's dismay. She then offers to fix Dreamland. The Tower (sarcastically) agrees, sending them both on their way while also promising to give Rusty his job back afterwards (and even throw him a Ticker-Tape Parade). While searching for the old tracks, Little Engine and Richard find themselves being chased by the Evening Express, who can not slow down to avoid hitting them. Richard, who suddenly believes that he is dreaming, tries to fly but ends up falling on the Evening Express. He manages to get back onto Little Engine but they are both pushed off the track by the Evening Express. After rolling through the hills, they manage to get back onto the tracks. They suddenly find the birthday present train, which had derailed when the tunnel collapsed. Little Engine decides to take the train to the real world herself and attempts to get information from the other engines about the old tracks, but they don't believe the tracks exist. Little Engine, Richard and the toy gang decide to find the tracks themselves.

Little Engine manages to find the old tracks that led up the mountain. Along the way, they come across an old, rickety bridge that partly collapses when trying to cross it. Richard barely falls off but is saved by Little Engine and Ace the Jet Plane. They use an old cargo hook pole as a makeshift rail for the bridge to get across to the other side. Late that evening, Little Engine runs out of water due to a leak in her water tank (which was caused from the collapsing bridge), causing the birthday present train to roll downhill backwards until Richard manages to stop it by applying Little Engine's emergency brake. Just then, a black engine appears and offers to take Little Engine's friends to the real world for her. She agrees and trusts the strange engine, but he suddenly betrays her trust and reveals himself as the Nightmare Train, an evil locomotive who can create nightmares and plans to use Richard as a means to send nightmares to the real world and leaves after derailing Little Engine and the birthday present train. In the Nightmare Train, Richard is confronted by hallucinations of the bullies but the others encourage him to stand up to them. Ace escapes and goes to help Little Engine after refilling her tank using water from a nearby water tower. She and the Caboose find themselves still unable to get back on the tracks. Little Engine sees another stretch of tracks below and drops down the cliff, successfully landing back on the tracks. Meanwhile, Richard manages to escape and falls off the Nightmare Train after a failed attempt to uncouple his boxcars. Little Engine soon finds him and they quickly chase down the Nightmare Train. While confronting him, the toys sneak out while Little Engine, Richard and Ace trick him into speeding down a side-track at extreme speed. Major then uses his badge to plug the leak in Little Engine's tank, and they continue their way up the mountain. They eventually make it to the top and travel through a portal that leads them to the real world, where no time has passed at all.

Once back, Richard has gained his confidence to stand up to the bullies and get his watch back. The bullies are then caught by the principal, who is annoyed that they aren't in detention. Richard reconciles with Marcus, who is proud of him for getting his watch back. When Marcus asks Richard how he got the watch back, Richard simply tells him that he thought he could (in which he did) and decides to keep his adventure in Dream Land a secret. Meanwhile, Little Engine returns to Dream Land, tells her story about her trip over the mountain and is promoted to a real Dream Hauler as a reward for her bravery while Rusty gets his job back as well. During the closing credits, the following photos are shown: toys with the new owners such as; Hudson with the new American boy, Bev with the new girl blowing candles from a birthday cake, Lou and Bud with the boy in glasses and safari clothing, Ace with the African-American boy, Major and Jillian with an unknown owner, Richard showing his grandfather's pocket watch to his class for Show & Tell, Nightmare Train defeated and derailed on a snow bank, Rusty's Ticker-Tape Parade and lastly, Little Engine taking more trains through the mountain.

Voice cast
 Alyson Stoner as Little Engine, a little steam shunter engine who dreams of being a Dream Hauler. Becomes close friends with Richard. At first she is unsure about taking the birthday train over the mountain, but with encouragement from Richard and the toys, and remembering Rusty's advice, Little Engine manages to bring the train over the mountain to the real world all by herself. Her eyes are on the sides of her cab and mouth on her smokebox much like her in-book look by Loren Long excluding the tender.
 Whoopi Goldberg as The Tower, a control tower who is in charge of everyone in the train yard.
 Patrick Warburton as The Caboose, a red caboose who is part of the birthday train.
 Jeff Bennett as Red Engine #35, a Dream Hauler who was supposed to take the birthday train through the mountain to the real world. He is red and can sometimes have accidents.
 Bennett also voices Hudson, a green and white sock monkey with a British accent who serves as the vice leader of the toys and Red Engine's fireman. Hopes to be fun for his child. Richard noted that he once had a sock monkey.
 Mocean Melvin as Big Locomotive, a silver streamlined Dream Hauler with a purple/orange stripe who's missing a tooth. He is one of the Dream Haulers who was sent to help dig out the tunnel after it collapses.
 Jim Cummings as Rusty, a senior Dream Hauler who offers advice to Little Engine. After accidentally bringing Richard to Dreamland, Rusty is demoted to track cleaner. Explains that before the Dream Tunnel was made, Dream Haulers had to go over the mountain. But because it was too dangerous, they decided to make the tunnel.Cummings also voices The Evening Express, a white streamlined diesel who pulls a fast express.
 Rodney Saulsberry as Freight Train #9, a green and orange Dream Hauler from the Union Pacific Railroad who hauls heavy freight trains. One of many who was sent to help dig out the tunnel.
 Brenda Song as Shiny Passenger Train, a yellow Dream Hauler who is very full of herself, she is one of many who was sent to help dig out the tunnel.
 Chelsea Erinne Evered as Doc the Girl Train, a pink and white engine who gives Rusty a broom-plow in place of his cowcatcher and gives it back at the end of the film.
 Ray Porter as The Nightmare Train, a black, spooky experimental steam engine who wanted to deliver scary, creepy nightmares. Tricks Little Engine into giving him the toys and Richard. Little Engine manages to outwit him by taking a wrong track. The credits determine his fate to be stuck on a snowdrift close to a cliff
 Dominic Scott Kay as Richard, a boy who wanders into Dreamland when Rusty accidentally falls asleep on the job, ripping a hole in the dream-reality continuum.
 Khamani Griffin as Marcus, Richard's friend at school.
 Michael Rodrigo and Luke Williams as Scott and Stretch, a pair of bullies who antagonize Richard in the real world.
 Jamie Lee Curtis as Bev, a female clown toy who serves as the leader of the toys and Red Engine's engineer.
 Charlie Schlatter as Major, a toy soldier who sometimes finishes his sentences with "sir". Gives up his badge to help bandage a leak in Little Engine's water tank.
 Jodi Benson as Jillian, a ballerina doll who dances when she is happy.
 Corbin Bleu and Rodney Saulsberry as Lou and Bud, a pair of twin stuffed giraffe toys. Lou has spots while Bud has yellow and orange squares. Lou is the more talkative one while Bud doesn't speak until near the end of the film.

Reception
The Little Engine That Could has a mixed to positive response.

See also
 The Little Engine That Could – the book it was based on
 The Little Engine That Could (1991 film) – the film adaptation of said book

References

External links
 
 Trailer on YouTube

American children's films
2011 animated films
2011 films
Animated films based on children's books
Universal Animation Studios animated films
2011 computer-animated films
Films with screenplays by David Koepp
2010s American animated films
American direct-to-video films
Universal Pictures direct-to-video animated films
2011 direct-to-video films
Universal Pictures direct-to-video films
Films scored by Heitor Pereira
Animated films about trains
2010s English-language films